Atrilinea is a genus of cyprinid fishes that contains only three species, all of which are endemic to China.

Species
 Atrilinea macrolepis S. L. Song & S. M. Fang, 1987
 Atrilinea macrops (S. Y. Lin, 1931)
 Atrilinea roulei (H. W. Wu, 1931)

References

 

Cyprinidae genera
Cyprinid fish of Asia
Freshwater fish of China